Skorpa is a mountain in Hol in Buskerud, Viken, Norway.

References 

Hol
Mountains of Viken